The Computer Go UEC Cup is an annual worldwide computer Go tournament held at the University of Electro-Communications (UEC) in Tokyo, Japan since 2007. The winners of the tournament would then play exhibition games against a professional Go player.

The tournament was typically structured as a preliminary Swiss-system invitational to determine challengers (with the previous year's UEC winners excluded), then a knockout tournament of sixteen players to determine the champion.

UEC Cup was terminated after its 10th edition in 2017 and was succeeded by AI Ryusei, a new computer Go tournament sponsored by Japanese Igo & Shogi Channel. In 2019, the University of Electro-Communications hosted the renewed 11th UEC Cup with new sponsors.

History
UEC Cup winners and runners-up

Exhibition games against professional Go players

References

External links

2017 UEC Cup

Computer Go
International Go competitions
Go competitions in Japan